201st Division or 201st Infantry Division may refer to:

 201st Infantry Division (German Empire)
 Italian 201st Coastal Division
 201st Division (Imperial Japanese Army)
 201st Motor Rifle Division
 201st Security Division